Jhon Fredy Murillo Murillo (born 13 June 1984) is a Colombian athlete specialising in the triple jump. He has won multiple medals on regional level.

His personal bests in the event is 16.74 metres (-1.6 m/s) set in Medellín in 2016. This is the current national record. In addition he has a personal best of 7.63 metres in the long jump (+1.0 m/s, Bogotá 2009).

International competitions

References

Living people
1984 births
Colombian male long jumpers
Colombian male triple jumpers
Pan American Games competitors for Colombia
Athletes (track and field) at the 2015 Pan American Games
Athletes (track and field) at the 2016 Summer Olympics
Olympic athletes of Colombia
Olympic male triple jumpers
South American Games bronze medalists for Colombia
South American Games medalists in athletics
Competitors at the 2014 South American Games
Athletes (track and field) at the 2018 South American Games
Competitors at the 2014 Central American and Caribbean Games
Competitors at the 2018 Central American and Caribbean Games
People from Apartadó
Sportspeople from Antioquia Department
20th-century Colombian people
21st-century Colombian people